The Men's Downhill in the 2022 FIS Alpine Skiing World Cup included eleven events including the final. A scheduled downhill on 5 December 2021 at Beaver Creek, Colorado was cancelled due to bad weather, but after several abortive attempts to run it at other venues, it was finally added to Kvitfjell on March 4, the day before the previously-scheduled race.

The season was interrupted by the 2022 Winter Olympics in Beijing, China (at the Yanqing National Alpine Skiing Centre in Yanqing District) from 6–19 February 2022.  The men's downhill was held at the "Rock" course on 7 February 2022.

After ten events, with just the season final remaining, Aleksander Aamodt Kilde of Norway had won three times and was clinging to a 23-point lead over four-time defending champion Beat Feuz of Switzerland going into the final, with Matthias Mayer of Austria and Dominik Paris of Italy also still alive. In the final, Kilde finished fourth for 50 points, but Feuz could only manage to finish third for 60 points, allowing Kilde to win by 13 points and giving him a sweep of the speed titles for the season, as he had already won the Super-G championship.

The season final took place on 16 March 2022 at Courchevel, France, on the new L'Éclipse course. Only the top 25 in the downhill discipline ranking and the winner of the Junior World Championship, plus athletes who have scored at least 500 points in the World Cup overall classification, are eligible to compete in the final, and only the top 15 earn points there.

Standings

DNF = Did Not Finish
DNS = Did Not Start
NE = Not Eligible for finals

See also
 2022 Alpine Skiing World Cup – Men's summary rankings
 2022 Alpine Skiing World Cup – Men's Overall
 2022 Alpine Skiing World Cup – Men's Super-G
 2022 Alpine Skiing World Cup – Men's Giant Slalom
 2022 Alpine Skiing World Cup – Men's Slalom
 2022 Alpine Skiing World Cup – Men's Parallel
 World Cup scoring system

References

External links
 Alpine Skiing at FIS website

External links
 

Men's downhill
FIS Alpine Ski World Cup men's downhill discipline titles